Keeping Left was a manifesto published in the United Kingdom in 1950 signed by 12 Labour Members of Parliament, 7 of whom had signed Keep Left three years before.

References 

Labour Party (UK) publications